The Chehalem Mountains AVA is an American Viticultural Area {AVA) located in the Yamhill and Washington counties of northwestern Oregon. It contains two sub-regions, Laurelwood District AVA and Ribbon Ridge AVA.

History
The petition process for the creation of the Chehalem Mountains AVA began in 2001 and was led by David Adelsheim of Adelsheim Vineyard. The AVA was officially established in 2006.

Geography
The Chehalem Mountains AVA corresponds to the Chehalem Mountains and is entirely contained within the Willamette Valley AVA. The region stretches  from Northwest of Wilsonville in the southeast to Forest Grove in the northwest featuring the elevations of Ribbon Ridge, Parrett Mountain and Bald Peak.

References

External links

American Viticultural Areas
Geography of Clackamas County, Oregon
Oregon wine
Geography of Washington County, Oregon
Geography of Yamhill County, Oregon
2006 establishments in Oregon